Kamau Wanyoke (born 1924) is a Kenyan sprinter. He competed in the men's 400 metres at the 1956 Summer Olympics.

References

External links
 

1924 births
Possibly living people
Athletes (track and field) at the 1956 Summer Olympics
Kenyan male sprinters
Olympic athletes of Kenya
Place of birth missing (living people)